Institute of Contemporary Art(s) or Institute for Contemporary Art may refer to:

United States 
Alphabetical by state

 Institute of Contemporary Art, Los Angeles, California 
 Institute of Contemporary Art San Francisco, California 
 Institute of Contemporary Art San José, California 
 Institute of Contemporary Art (Miami), Florida 
 Institute of Contemporary Art, Boston, Massachusetts 
 Institute of Contemporary Art, Philadelphia, Pennsylvania 
 Institute for Contemporary Art, Richmond, Virginia, US

Other countries 
Alphabetical by country
 Perth Institute of Contemporary Arts, Perth, Australia
 Institute for Contemporary Art, Zagreb, Croatia
 Institute of Contemporary Arts Singapore, Singapore
 Institute of Contemporary Arts, London, UK